For the 1922 Tour de France, although World War I was already a few years ago, its economic impact was not yet over. The cycling companies were still not able to sponsor the cyclists in the way they did before the war, so as in 1919, 1920 and 1921 they bundled their forces under the nick La Sportive. The cyclists were divided in two categories, this time named 1ère classe (first class), the professionals, and 2ème classe (second class), the amateurs.

The French cyclists Henri and Francis Pélissier had stopped the 1920 Tour de France after Henri received a penalty from the Tour organisation for throwing away a tire. For this reason, the Pélissier brothers did not start in the 1921 and 1922 Tours.

By starting number

By nationality

References

1922 Tour de France
1922